The Narrow Margin is a 1952 American film noir starring Charles McGraw and  Marie Windsor. Directed by Richard Fleischer, the RKO picture was  written by Earl Felton, based on an unpublished story written by Martin Goldsmith and Jack Leonard. The screenplay by Earl Felton was nominated for an Academy Award.

A police detective plays a deadly game of cat-and-mouse aboard a train with mob assassins out to stop a slain gangster's widow before she can testify before a grand jury.

Plot
Detective Sergeant Walter Brown (Charles McGraw) of the Los Angeles Police Department and his partner are assigned to protect a mob boss's widow, Mrs. Frankie Neall (Marie Windsor), as she rides a train from Chicago to Los Angeles to testify before a grand jury. She is also carrying a payoff list that belonged to her murdered husband. The mob's hitmen do not know what she looks like. On the way to pick her up, Brown bets his partner and friend, Sergeant Gus Forbes (Don Beddoe), what she will be like: "She's the sixty-cent special. Cheap. Flashy. Strictly poison under the gravy."

As the detectives and Mrs. Neall leave her apartment, they are waylaid by a mob assassin named Densel (Peter Virgo). Forbes is shot to death, but Densel, although wounded by Brown, escapes. At the train station, Brown discovers that he has been followed by gangster Joseph Kemp (David Clarke). Kemp identifies Brown as the detective even before they board the train. Each man knows the other is a mortal enemy. With the help of a conductor, Kemp comes into Brown's room while Brown is there, under the pretense that he is looking for lost luggage. Meanwhile, an overweight man confronts Brown in front of other passengers as to why Brown is holding a two room compartment, while he is in the upper berth of a section.

Kemp tries to open the door to the next compartment, where Mrs. Neall is hiding, but Brown tells the conductor that the room is empty, and Kemp and the conductor leave. Brown knows that Kemp will come back to Mrs. Neall's room, so he hides Mrs. Neall in the ladies room with all of her luggage, and goes to the dining car so Kemp will know that the room is unguarded. Kemp then goes back and searches both rooms, finding nothing. After Kemp returns to the dining car, Brown leaves the dining car to escort Mrs. Neall back to her room. Later, mobster Vincent Yost (Peter Brocco) meets Brown and unsuccessfully tries to bribe him into pointing out Mrs. Neall and abandoning her, appealing to both his greed and his fear (Brown tells Yost he is under arrest for bribery but Brown is out of his jurisdiction so he has no arresting authority). He even suggests that Brown could use the bribe to help the family of his murdered partner, Gus Forbes.

Brown's relationship with Mrs. Neall is caustic. She is a vile and profane brunette, who flirts with him while expressing doubt about his integrity and commitment to protecting her. She doesn't seem to care that Brown's partner was murdered. On the train, she insists on playing records on her portable record player and endangering both of them, angering Brown. By chance Brown makes friends with an attractive blonde train passenger he meets, Ann Sinclair (Jacqueline White), and her spoiled, too-observant young son Tommy (Gordon Gebert). When Kemp spots Brown with her, he mistakes Sinclair for his target. After Brown beats him up in a fight and questions him, the policeman learns of the mistake. Brown again attempts an arrest without arresting authority. But this time, he turns Kemp over to railroad agent Sam Jennings (Paul Maxey) and hurries to warn Ann Sinclair. Densel, however, has boarded the train during a brief stop at La Junta, Colorado, and waylays Jennings, freeing Kemp.

Brown tries to explain to Ann Sinclair that mobsters on the train plan to kill a Mrs. Neall and that they mistakenly think that she is Mrs. Neall. But she stuns him by revealing that she is the real Mrs. Neall. The woman he has been protecting is an undercover policewoman, a decoy, and Brown was not told of either woman's true identity in case he might be corrupt. Plus, Ann Sinclair had earlier mailed the payoff list to the Los Angeles District Attorney. Meanwhile, Densel and Kemp enter Brown's compartment to search for the payoff list and discover the fake Mrs. Neall in the next compartment; the music from her record player gives her away. They enter her room through trickery, and Densel shoots her dead as she tries to sneak her gun out of her purse. Then Kemp discovers a badge and police identification, identifying her as Chicago PD policewoman Sarah Meggs, hidden within her record player.

Densel, deducing the truth, goes for Ann Sinclair. Her door is locked, but he knocks on the next door and Ann's son Tommy opens the door and Densel enters, grabbing Tommy. Densel knocks on the interior door to Ann Sinclair's room and threatens to kill Tommy if she doesn't open her door, which she does. He pushes Tommy away and locks himself in with Ann Sinclair and demands the payoff list. Then Brown and Jennings arrive and Densel is trapped, but he has Ann Sinclair as hostage. Brown uses the reflection from the window of a train on the next track to see into Ann Sinclair's compartment, and he shoots Densel through the door without endangering her, then enters the compartment and finishes him off with more shots. Kemp jumps off the stopped train and heads for accomplices in a car which has been following the train, but they are all quickly arrested. The movie ends with the train arriving in Los Angeles and Brown escorting Ann Sinclair from the train station toward the court house. She chooses to walk with Brown the two blocks straight to testify rather than sneak out under cover.

Cast
 Charles McGraw as Det. Sgt. Walter Brown
 Marie Windsor as Mrs. Frankie Neall
 Jacqueline White as Ann Sinclair
 Peter Virgo as Densel
 Gordon Gebert as Tommy Sinclair
 Queenie Leonard as Mrs. Troll
 David Clarke as Joseph Kemp
 Don Beddoe as Det. Sgt. Gus Forbes
 Paul Maxey as Sam Jennings
 Peter Brocco as Vincent Yost

Production
The film was based on a story by Martin Goldsmith and Jack Leonard titled "Target". RKO bought it in 1950.

Music score
The film does not have a music score in the usual meaning of the term: the director substituted actual train sounds in places where music would ordinarily be heard for dramatic effect.

However, the film does have music, which is stock music "played" on a passenger's (Marie Windsor's) record player in her compartment.

Release
Richard Fleischer says that RKO's owner, Howard Hughes, was so taken with the film he considered remaking it with Robert Mitchum and Jane Russell. He eventually decided against it but he did assign Fleischer to reshoot sections of the Mitchum-Russell film, His Kind of Woman, with the screenwriter of Margin, Earl Felton, providing uncredited rewrites for the latter picture. The Narrow Margin release was held up for two years after its completion.

Reception

Critical response
The Narrow Margin is considered by critics and film historians to be a classic example of film noir. Well received at the time of its release, the production was made as a model B movie. In 1952, critic Howard Thompson of The New York Times gave high marks to the low-budget film:Using a small cast of comparative unknowns, headed by Charles McGraw, Marie Windsor and Jacqueline White, this inexpensive Stanley Rubin production for R.K.O. is almost a model of electric tension that, at least technically, nudges some of the screen's thriller milestones. Crisply performed and written and directed by Earl Felton and Richard Fleischer with tingling economy, this unpretentious offering should glue anyone to the edge of his seat and prove, once and for all, that a little can be made to count for a lot.

Later, in 2005, film critic Dennis Schwartz said, "A breathtakingly suspenseful low-budget crime thriller that is flawlessly directed ... The fast-paced pulpish taut story is filled with tense incidents and a well-executed twist."

The review aggregator Rotten Tomatoes reported that 100% of critics gave the film a positive review, based on 10 reviews.

Noir analysis
Film critic Blake Lucas makes the case that The Narrow Margin reflects the "noir view" of an unstable and deceiving moral reality.

Awards and honors
 Academy Award for Best Writing (Motion Picture Story), Earl Felton, 1953. (nominated)

Adaptation
The film was remade as Narrow Margin with Anne Archer and Gene Hackman in 1990. It was directed by Peter Hyams. Hackman's performance was praised, but the later version is generally considered a lesser work compared to the original movie.

References

External links
 
 
 
 
 

1952 films
1950s psychological thriller films
American black-and-white films
1950s English-language films
Fictional portrayals of the Los Angeles Police Department
Film noir
Films directed by Richard Fleischer
Films set in Chicago
Films set in Los Angeles
Films set on trains
RKO Pictures films
American psychological thriller films
1950s American films